The 1925 Utah Utes football team was an American football team that represented the University of Utah as a member of the Rocky Mountain Conference (RMC) during the 1925 college football season. In its first season under head coach Ike Armstrong, the team compiled an overall record of 6–2 record with a mark of 5–1 against conference opponents, tying for second place in the RMC.

Schedule

References

Utah
Utah Utes football seasons
Utah Utes football